Brachyistius frenatus, commonly known as the kelp perch, is a species of surfperch native to the eastern Pacific Ocean from British Columbia, Canada to Baja California, Mexico where it is found in kelp forests down to a depth of about .  This fish is also known to be a cleaner fish.  This species can reach a length of  TL.  It can also be found on display at public aquariums.

References

External links
 Photograph

Embiotocidae
Fish described in 1862
Taxa named by Theodore Gill